Kristian Ivanov Vigenin (born 12 June 1975) is a Bulgarian politician, member of the Bulgarian Parliament, former Minister of Foreign Affairs of Bulgaria, and a former Member of the European Parliament.

He became minister on May 29, 2013 in the cabinet of Plamen Oresharski, where he served until the new government took office on August 6, 2014.
 
In the European Parliament, Mr. Vigenin was a member of the Coalition for Bulgaria, part of the Party of European Socialists, and became an MEP on 1 January 2007 with the accession of Bulgaria to the European Union.

Early life and education
Born in Sofia, Vigenin received Bachelor's degree in International Economics and Macroeconomics at the University of National and World Economy in 1998. He is fluent in English, French, German, Russian and his native Bulgarian.

Political career

Early political career
Vigenin's political career began in 1994 while still a student in his alma mater. During that time, he became a founder of the Bulgarian Socialist Youth and served three consecutive terms in office, until 2000. From March 1999 to March 2001 Vigenin served as senior expert on the European Union Integration Directorate of the Bulgarian Customs Agency. In 2000 Kristian Vigenin was elected to the Supreme Council of the Bulgarian Socialist Party and in the end of 2001 became a member of the Executive Bureau of the Party. Since 2003, he was a full member of the Socialist International and a member of the Party of European Socialists, since 2005. Following his membership in BSP, Vigenin was elected as Member of Parliament from Yambol and the same year became a member of the European Parliament. After May 2007, Vigenin was elected as MEP and was a winner of his re-election in 2009.

Ukraine
On November 9, 2013, Vigenin traveled to Odessa, Ukraine where he met with Minister of Foreign Affairs Leonid Kozhara and Prime Minister of Ukraine Mykola Azarov. In December of the same year, Vigenin again visited Ukraine. That month he spoke at the Ukrainian capital Kyiv on OSCE, the Helsinki Accords and Helsinki+40 Process which was discussed in Dublin in 2012.

European Union
On July 3, 2014, Kristian Vigenin met with Ivica Dačić, the Serbian Minister of Foreign Affairs. The two discussed a plan on how to built the South Stream gas pipeline, a plan which was later called off due to the Russian actions in Eastern Ukraine.

The same year, he met with the Romanian Foreign Affairs Minister Titus Corlățean and discussed the possible integration of Republics of Moldova and Georgia into the European Union, the EU Association Agreement and the Deep and Comprehensive Free Trade Agreement. Prior to the 2014 meeting, they discussed the same issues in August 2013 at the Foreign Affairs Council, during which, besides those issues, the two also discussed Middle East and North Africa, with special focus on Egypt and Syria.

See also
List of foreign ministers in 2014
Foreign relations of Bulgaria
List of Bulgarians

References

External links

Biography at the website of the Bulgarian government
European Parliament profile

1975 births
Coalition for Bulgaria MEPs
Foreign ministers of Bulgaria
Living people
MEPs for Bulgaria 2007
MEPs for Bulgaria 2007–2009
MEPs for Bulgaria 2009–2014
People from Sofia
University of National and World Economy alumni